Tony Harnell & the Wildflowers featuring Bublefoot is a 2013 album by Tony Harnell and The Wildflowers. The album was released May 7, 2013.

The album features guest contributions from Guns N' Roses guitarist Ron "Bumblefoot" Thal. Thal and Harnell knew each other since 1992, and in 2012 reunited to discuss working together.

The album received partial funding through crowdfunding via PledgeMusic.

Track listing

Personnel
 Tony Harnell – lead vocals
 Jason Hagen – guitars
 Ron "Bumblefoot" Thal - guitars, vocals
 Cassandra Sotos – acoustic & 7-string electric violins
 Amy Harnell - vocals
 Brad Gunyon - percussion

References

2013 EPs
Ron "Bumblefoot" Thal albums